Primate of Serbia may refer to:

 Primate of Serbia (Roman Catholic), historical and honorary title of Roman Catholic archbishops of Bar, in modern Montenegro
 colloquial term for the heads (historically: archbishops, metropolitans or patriarchs) of the Serbian Orthodox Church, in Serbia

See also 
 Primate (disambiguation)
 Serbia (disambiguation)